Phippsøya (anglicized as Phipps Island) is the largest island in Sjuøyane, an archipelago north of Nordaustlandet, Svalbard in Arctic Norway. It is located some 22 km north of Nordkapp on Svalbard proper and 8.5 km south of Rossøya, the northernmost island of the Svalbard archipelago. Phippsøya is separated from Parryøya to the south by the 1.3 km wide Straumporten sound, from Martensøya to the southeast by the 1.1 km wide Trollsundet and from Tavleøya to the northwest by the 1 km wide Marmorsundet.

References

Conway, W. M. 1906. No Man's Land: A History of Spitsbergen from Its Discovery in 1596 to the Beginning of the Scientific Exploration of the Country. Cambridge: At the University Press.

External links
 Norwegian Polar Institute Place Names of Svalbard Database

Islands of Svalbard